The Little Brown Jug is a trophy contested between the Michigan Wolverines football team of the University of Michigan and the Minnesota Golden Gophers football team of the University of Minnesota. The Little Brown Jug is an earthenware jug that serves as a trophy awarded to the winner of the game. It is one of the oldest and most played rivalries in American college football, dating to 1892.  The Little Brown Jug is the most regularly exchanged rivalry trophy in college football, the oldest trophy game in FBS college football, and the second oldest rivalry trophy overall, next to the 1899 Territorial Cup (which did not become a travelling/exchange trophy until 2001), contested between Arizona and Arizona State (which did not become a four-year college until 1925).

Both universities are founding members of the Big Ten Conference. As a result of the Big Ten not playing a complete round-robin schedule, Michigan and Minnesota occasionally did not play. In 2011, with the conference's initiation of divisional play, Michigan and Minnesota were both placed in the Big Ten's Legends division under the new two-division alignment. However, when the conference expanded again three years later, the teams were split into opposite divisions (Michigan in the East, Minnesota in the West). The conference stated there will be only one protected crossover matchup under the new alignment (Indiana vs. Purdue for the Old Oaken Bucket), meaning the rivalry will not be contested every year.  However, the two schools will meet at least twice in each six-year scheduling cycle.

Michigan is the current holder of the jug with a 49–24 victory on October 24, 2020. Through the end of the 2020 season, Michigan leads the series, 76–25–3.

Series history

Pre-Brown Jug
The teams met for the first time in 1892 in Minneapolis, with Minnesota prevailing 14–6. Michigan and Minnesota played five more games over the next decade, Michigan winning four of those five.

1903 game

The earthenware jug, originally used by Michigan coach Fielding H. Yost, is painted with the victories of each team. The name most likely originates in the 1869 song of the same name by Joseph Winner.

After Yost took over coaching the Wolverines in 1901, the team went on to win 28 straight games. In the meantime, Minnesota assembled one of the best teams in school history, so Gopher fans were excited about possibly ending the Wolverines' streak.

When Yost and the team came into Minneapolis for the 1903 game, student manager Thomas B. Roberts was told to purchase something to carry water. Yost was somewhat concerned that Gopher fans might contaminate his water supply. Roberts purchased a five-gallon jug for 30¢ from a local variety store in Dinkytown. The jug itself is known as a Red Wing Pottery "five gallon beehive jug", and was made in Red Wing, Minnesota.

Twenty thousand fans watched the matchup between the two teams in an overflowing Northrop Field. Minnesota held the fabled "point-a-minute" squad to just one touchdown, but hadn't yet managed to score a touchdown of their own. Finally, late in the second half, the Gophers reached the endzone to tie the game at 6.  As clouds from an impending storm hung overhead, pandemonium struck when Minnesota fans stormed the field in celebration. Eventually the game had to be called with two minutes remaining. The Wolverines walked off the field, leaving the jug behind in the locker room of the University of Minnesota Armory.

The next day custodian Oscar Munson brought the jug to L. J. Cooke, head of the Minnesota athletics department, and declared in a thick Scandinavian accent: "Yost left his yug." Exactly how Munson came to possess the jug is a bit of a mystery. Some accounts say that Munson purposely stole the jug in the chaos that ended the game, although most believe it was accidentally left behind. Thomas Roberts, writing in 1956, stated that the jug had served its purpose, so he intentionally left it sitting on the field.

Still, Cooke and Munson were excited to have this little bit of memorabilia, proceeding to paint it brown (it had originally been putty-colored and currently is painted half blue, which is Michigan's color) and commemorate the day by writing "Michigan Jug –; Captured by Oscar, October 31, 1903" on the side along with the score "Michigan 6, Minnesota 6". Of course, in the spirit of the moment, Minnesota's score was written many times larger than that of Michigan.

When the two schools met in football again in 1909, Cooke and the Minnesota team captain decided that playing for the jug "might be material to build up a fine tradition between the two institutions." When presented with this idea, Yost and Michigan's captain agreed, and the jug thus became the traveling trophy it is today. Michigan took home the jug in 1909 and 1910. Minnesota and Michigan met up again in 1919 after Michigan rejoined the Big Ten Conference, marking the first year that Minnesota won the jug outright.

Other notable games

"The Battle of Giants" occurred in 1940, with undefeated Minnesota facing undefeated Michigan on November 9, 1940. Minnesota won 7–6. Minnesota went on to go 8–0 and win the national championship. 

In 1977, Minnesota stunned #1 Michigan 16–0; it was the only loss of the regular season for the Wolverines as they advanced to (and lost) the 1978 Rose Bowl to the Washington Huskies.

In 1986, Minnesota was regarded as an easy victory for #2 Michigan as a 25-point underdog. With two minutes to go and the game tied at 17, Minnesota quarterback Rickey Foggie scrambled to put Chip Lohmiller in position to kick the winning field goal. The Gophers took home the Little Brown Jug from Michigan for the first time since 1977. Similarly, it was Michigan's only loss in the regular season on their way to losing the 1987 Rose Bowl.

The 2003 game was one of the most highly anticipated Michigan–Minnesota matchups in years. This was the 100th Anniversary of the 1903 game. The Little Brown Jug was featured on the cover of the Michigan  Football Media Guide. Minnesota was ranked #17 and Michigan was ranked #20 with the game at Hubert H. Humphrey Metrodome. Down 28–7, Michigan put together a comeback in the fourth quarter to win 38–35. Michigan advanced to (and lost) the 2004 Rose Bowl. The next season, in another highly anticipated game, #14 Michigan came back again in the fourth quarter to defeat #13 Minnesota 27–24. Michigan advanced to (and lost) the 2005 Rose Bowl. In 2013, the 2003 game was singled out as one of the biggest setbacks to the Gopher football team rebuilding since their last Big Ten Championship in 1967.

Michigan has dominated the series since 1968, during which Minnesota has held the jug only four times. On October 8, 2005, Minnesota claimed the jug for the first time since 1986, defeating Michigan 23–20 on a last second field goal in Ann Arbor, Michigan. The Wolverines grabbed the trophy right back the next year on September 30, with a 28–14 victory in Minneapolis.

Michigan won all 12 meetings with Minnesota at the Hubert H. Humphrey Metrodome, which the Gophers shared with the Minnesota Twins and Minnesota Vikings from 1982 through 2008. To date, Michigan has not lost a road game against the Gophers since 1977 and have won the last 17 games between the teams in Minnesota. The Gophers last defeated Michigan 30–14, ending a six-game win streak by Michigan.

Accomplishments by the two rivals

Game results

Note: Michigan and Minnesota played twice in 1926 (on October 16 in Ann Arbor and on November 20 in Minneapolis) due to conference scheduling issues for Minnesota.

See also 
 List of NCAA college football rivalry games
 List of most-played college football series in NCAA Division I
 Lions–Vikings rivalry

References

Additional sources

Bibliography
Gruver, Edward (2002), Nitschke. Lanham:Taylor Trade Publishing.

External links

 Little Brown Jug Lore

College football rivalries in the United States
Michigan Wolverines football
Minnesota Golden Gophers football
Big Ten Conference rivalries